The large intestine (Chinese: 大肠/大腸: pinyin: dà cháng) is one of the fu organs stipulated by traditional Chinese medicine (TCM). As distinct from the Western medical concept of large intestine, this concept from TCM is more a way of describing a set of interrelated parts than an anatomical organ.  It is a functionally defined entity and not equivalent to the anatomical organ of the same name.

Functions
The large intestine meridian communicates with the lung, with which it is externally-internally related. The two paired organs are associated with the metal element and the emotion of grief. The main function of the large intestine is to receive the waste material sent down from the small intestine, absorb its fluid content, and form the remainder into faeces to be excreted. Pathological changes of the large intestine will lead to dysfunction in this transportation function, resulting in loose stools and constipation. The large intestine's function is said to be the strongest between 5am and 7am.

Large intestinal disease
Large intestinal disease (dà cháng bìng) is attributable to evils such as heat, cold, stagnation, dampness, and wind, or to vacuity. Rumbling intestines or pain around the umbilicus, constipation or diarrhea, bloody stool or tenesmus with blood and pus in the stool, and prolapse of the rectum are signs of large intestine disease. The main patterns are listed below:
Large intestinal vacuity cold (dà cháng xü hán)
Large intestinal humor depletion (dà cháng yè kuï)
Large intestinal damp-heat (dà cháng shï rè)
Large intestinal heat bind (dà cháng rè jié)
Large intestinal cold bind (dà cháng hán jié)

Notes

Bibliography

Cheng, X.-n., Deng, L., & Cheng, Y. (Eds.). (1987). Chinese Acupuncture And Moxibustion. Beijing: Foreign Languages Press.
Maciocia, G. (2005). The Foundations Of Chinese Medicine: A Comprehensive Text For Acupuncturists And Herbalists. Philadelphia, MA: Elseverier Churchill Livingstone.
Yin, H.-h., & Shuai, H.-c. (1992). Fundamentals Of Traditional Chinese Medicine. Beijing, China: Foreign Languages Press.

Traditional Chinese medicine